

Buildings and structures

Buildings
 c. 1200
 Banteay Kdei temple built in Angkor, Khmer Empire.
 St Hilda's Church, Hartlepool built in England.
 Borgund Stave Church and Heddal Stave Church built in Norway.
 1200 – Qutb Minar minaret in the Delhi Sultanate begun.
 1201 – Cloth Hall, Ypres, begun.
 1202 – Rouen Cathedral begun.
 1206 – Göğceli Mosque, Çarşamba, built.
 c. 1206 – Cathedral of Amalfi in the Kingdom of Sicily completed.

Births

Deaths

References

1200s works